is a subway station in Taitō, Tokyo, Japan, operated by Tokyo Metro.

Lines
Its station number is H-19.

Station layout
The station consists of two opposed side platforms serving two tracks.

Platforms

History
The station opened on 28 March 1961.

The station facilities were inherited by Tokyo Metro after the privatization of the Teito Rapid Transit Authority (TRTA) in 2004.

Surrounding area
 Uguisudani Station (on the JR Yamanote Line)
 Yoshiwara district
 Akiba Shrine

References

External links

 Tokyo Metro station information 

Railway stations in Japan opened in 1961
Railway stations in Tokyo